Marquise is a commune in the Pas-de-Calais department in the Hauts-de-France region of France.

Geography
The river Slack flows through the commune, as does the A16 autoroute. Marquise-Rinxent station has rail connections to Calais and Boulogne-sur-Mer.

History
Part of the Flemish-speaking territory until 1346, Marquise became an English county under King Edward III after the battle of Crécy and the hexagonal bell-tower goes back to the English period. In 1420, in the suburbs of Marquise, at Leulinghen, the church of which was divided by the French-English border, King Henry V married Catherine of Valois, daughter of Charles VI of France. Marquise received national media attention in autumn 2006 when the local gendarmerie retrieved a famous painting by Maurice Boitel, stolen forty years before and taken out of France.

Population

Places of interest
 The church of St.Martin, dating from the thirteenth century.
 A watermill and manorhouse of the 17th century.
 The marble quarries.
 The Commonwealth War Graves Commission cemetery.

Notable people
 Alphonse Pinart, explorer, was born here in 1852.

See also
 Communes of the Pas-de-Calais department

References

External links

 A history of the town 
 The CWGC cemetery

Communes of Pas-de-Calais